Rhizopuspepsin (Rhizopus aspartic proteinase, neurase, Rhizopus acid protease, Rhizopus acid proteinase) is an enzyme. This enzyme catalyses the following chemical reaction

 Hydrolysis of proteins with broad specificity similar to that of pepsin A, preferring hydrophobic residues at P1 and P1'. Clots milk and activates trypsinogen.

From the zygomycete fungus Rhizopus chinensis. A similar endopeptidase is found in R. niveus [2]. In peptidase family A1 (pepsin A family).

References

External links 
 

EC 3.4.23